USS Sweetwater County (LST-1152) was a  in the United States Coast Guard during World War II. She was transferred to the Republic of China Navy as ROCS Chung Ming (LST-227).

Construction and commissioning 
LST-1152 was laid down on 5 March 1945 at Chicago Bridge and Iron Company, Seneca, Illinois. Launched on 8 June 1945 and commissioned on 30 June 1945.

Service in the United States Navy 
During World War II, LST-1152 was assigned to the Asiatic-Pacific Theater. She was assigned to occupation and Far East from 1 November to 22 December 1945.

She was decommissioned on 1 July 1946 and struck from the Naval Register on 6 February 1956 after she was transferred to the Republic of China and renamed Chung Ming (LST-227). While being mothballed on 1 July 1955, she was given the name Sweetwater County.

Service in the Republic of China Navy 
On 18 March 2021, she participated in a military exercise.

Awards 
LST-1152 have earned the following awards:

American Campaign Medal 
Asiatic-Pacific Campaign Medal
World War II Victory Medal
Navy Occupation Service Medal (with Asia clasp)

Citations

Sources
 
 
 
 

LST-542-class tank landing ships
Ships built in Seneca, Illinois
World War II amphibious warfare vessels of the United States
LST-542-class tank landing ships of the Republic of China Navy
1945 ships